Edward Dransfield (28 November 1906–1986) was an English professional footballer who played in the Football League for Mansfield Town, Rotherham United and Swindon Town.

References

1906 births
1986 deaths
English footballers
Association football defenders
English Football League players
Rotherham United F.C. players
Birmingham City F.C. players
Swindon Town F.C. players
Southampton F.C. players
Mansfield Town F.C. players
Bath City F.C. players